Arthur ("Aute") Hoffmann (10 December 1887 – 4 April 1932) was a German athlete.  He competed at the 1908 Summer Olympics in London. He was born in Danzig, and died in Hamburg, Germany.

Hoffmann was a member of the silver medal German medley relay team.  He was the first runner of the four-man squad, running 200 metres and followed by Hans Eicke, Otto Trieloff, and Hanns Braun.  The team dominated the first round, defeating the Dutch team easily with a time of 3:43.2.  In the final, though, the Germans could not match the American team.  Hoffmann was seven yards behind the leading American and one behind the second-place Hungarian when he finished his 200.  The German team moved into second place at the very end of the race, however, giving Hoffmann a silver medal.

Hoffman also competed in the 100 metre and 200 metre races, placing second in his first round heats in both and not advancing. In the long jump competition he finished 15th.

References

Sources
 
 
 

1887 births
1932 deaths
German male sprinters
German male long jumpers
Athletes (track and field) at the 1908 Summer Olympics
Olympic athletes of Germany
Medalists at the 1908 Summer Olympics
Olympic silver medalists for Germany
Olympic silver medalists in athletics (track and field)